Brian Buckley may refer to:

 Brian Buckley (footballer, born 1935) (1935–2014), Australian rules footballer for Carlton and Port Melbourne
 Brian Buckley (political advisor) (1935–2013), Australian rules footballer for Footscray, journalist and political advisor